The Mahatma Gandhi International School is a private international school located in Pasay, adjacent to Merville Park subdivision, Metro Manila, Philippines. Established in 2002, the school offers the International Baccalaureate Diploma Programme and the International General Certificate of Secondary Education for students from Kindergarten to Grade 12.

Background

Location 

It is located at 3270 Armstrong Avenue, Merville Access Road, in Pasay, the school is close to Makati, Magallanes, Moonwalk, Better Living, and Parañaque being accessible from the South Luzon Expressway, C-5 Road, and Doña Soledad.

History 

MGIS was established by the Mahatma Gandhi Education Foundation.

Details of schools

Organisation and management

MGIS is an independent, non-profit school modeled upon international practice.

Academics 

The school offers an education to students of all nationalities. Classes are offered from kindergarten to Grade 12.

See also 

 Indian Filipino
 Hinduism in the Philippines
 India–Philippines relations
 List of India-related topics in the Philippines

 History of Indian influence on Southeast Asia
 Indianisation
 Indian influences in early Philippine polities

References

External links
Mahatma Gandhi International School official website
International Baccalaureate - Mahatma Gandhi International School

International schools in Metro Manila
International Baccalaureate schools in the Philippines
Schools in Pasay
Indian international schools